Earl of Lytton, in the County of Derby, is a title in the Peerage of the United Kingdom. It was created in 1880 for the diplomat and poet Robert Bulwer-Lytton, 2nd Baron Lytton. He was Viceroy of India from 1876 to 1880 and British Ambassador to France from 1887 to 1891. He was made Viscount Knebworth, of Knebworth in the County of Hertford, at the same time he was given the earldom, also in the Peerage of the United Kingdom.

History
Robert Bulwer-Lytton was the son of the poet, novelist and politician Edward Bulwer-Lytton, 1st Baron Lytton and his wife, the novelist Rosina Doyle Wheeler. Edward was the author of numerous popular novels, poems and dramas and also served as Secretary of State for the Colonies under the Earl of Derby between 1858 and 1859. Born Edward Bulwer, he was the third and youngest son of General William Earle Bulwer and his wife Elizabeth Barbara, daughter of Richard Warburton Lytton of Knebworth House, Hertfordshire (through which marriage the Knebworth estate came into the Bulwer family). He was created a Baronet, of Knebworth House in the County of Hertford, in the Baronetage of the United Kingdom, in 1838, and in 1866, he was raised to the Peerage of the United Kingdom as Baron Lytton, of Knebworth in the County of Hertford. In 1844, he also assumed by Royal licence the additional surname and arms of Lytton.

The first Earl of Lytton was succeeded by his son, the second Earl. He was also a politician and served as Under-Secretary of State for India from 1920 to 1922 and as Governor of Bengal from 1922 to 1927. Lord Lytton married Pamela Plowden, remembered as the first great love of Winston Churchill. Their two sons, Antony Bulwer-Lytton, Viscount Knebworth, and Alexander Bulwer-Lytton, Viscount Knebworth, both predeceased them, Antony killed in a plane crash in 1933 and Alexander killed in action in World War II. Their daughter Lady Hermione Lytton married Cameron Cobbold, 1st Baron Cobbold, and through this marriage Knebworth House passed to the Cobbold family (see the Baron Cobbold).

Lord Lytton was succeeded by his younger brother, the third Earl. He was a portrait and landscape painter. In 1899 he married Judith Blunt, 16th Baroness Wentworth, the renowned horse breeder who devoted her life to the Crabbet Arabian Stud. The stud had been created by her parents, the poet Wilfrid Scawen Blunt and his wife Anne, 15th Baroness Wentworth, granddaughter of Lord Byron and Ada Lovelace (see the Baron Wentworth for earlier history of this title). They were divorced in 1923.

Lord Lytton and Lady Wentworth were succeeded, respectively, in 1951 and 1957 by their son Noel Lytton, 4th Earl of Lytton; as a consequence the title Baron Wentworth, in the Peerage of England, became subsidiary to the Earldom of Lytton. He assumed by deed poll the additional surname of Milbanke in 1925 but discontinued by deed poll the use of this surname in 1951.  the titles are held by his eldest son, the fifth Earl, who succeeded in 1985.

Another member of the family was the Liberal politician, diplomat and writer Henry Bulwer, 1st Baron Dalling and Bulwer. He was the elder brother of the first Baron Lytton.

The family seat is Newbuildings Place, near Shipley, West Sussex.

Barons Lytton (1866)
Edward Bulwer-Lytton, 1st Baron Lytton (1803–1873)
Edward Robert Bulwer-Lytton, 2nd Baron Lytton (1831–1891) (created Earl of Lytton in 1880)

Earls of Lytton (1880)
Edward Robert Bulwer-Lytton, 1st Earl of Lytton (1831–1891)
Edward Roland John Bulwer-Lytton (1865–1871)
Hon. Henry Meredith Edward Bulwer-Lytton (1872–1874)
Victor Alexander George Robert Bulwer-Lytton, 2nd Earl of Lytton (1876–1947)
(Edward) Antony James Bulwer-Lytton, Viscount Knebworth (1903-1933)
Alexander Edward John Bulwer-Lytton, Viscount Knebworth MBE (1910-1942)
Neville Stephen Bulwer-Lytton, 3rd Earl of Lytton (1879–1951)
Noel Anthony Scawen Lytton-Milbanke, 4th Earl of Lytton (1900–1985)
John Peter Michael Scawen Lytton, 5th Earl of Lytton (b. 1950)

The heir apparent is the present holder's son Philip Anthony Scawen Lytton, Viscount Knebworth (b. 1989)

References

Additional source
Kidd, Charles, Williamson, David (editors). Debrett's Peerage and Baronetage (1990 edition). New York: St Martin's Press, 1990.

 
1880 establishments in the United Kingdom
Earldoms in the Peerage of the United Kingdom
Noble titles created in 1880